Thornton Fractional Township High School District 215, more commonly known as T.F. District 215, is composed of two high schools and the supplementary Center for Academics and Technology.

Because of their excessively long names, among administrators and students alike, they are commonly referred to as T.F. North, T.F. South, and the CAT Center.

High schools
Thornton Fractional Township North High School, in Calumet City, Illinois
Thornton Fractional Township South High School, in Lansing, Illinois
The Thornton Fractional Center for Academics and Technology, also in Calumet City

External links
The District's Website

School districts in Cook County, Illinois